The women's halfpipe event in snowboarding at the 2006 Winter Olympics was held in Bardonecchia, a village in the Province of Turin, Italy. Competition took place on 13 February 2006.

Results

References

Snowboarding at the 2006 Winter Olympics
2006 in women's sport
Women's events at the 2006 Winter Olympics